McCloud  is a small town and census-designated place (CDP) in Siskiyou County, California, United States.  Its population is 945 as of the 2020 census, down from 1,101 from the 2010 census.

Commerce and tourism
Located in the Shasta Cascade area of Northern California, McCloud sees many visitors.  Visitors use McCloud as a base to engage in nationally recognized trout fishing in the nearby McCloud, Sacramento  and Klamath Rivers, or come to see and climb Mount Shasta, Castle Crags or the Trinity Alps.  Visitors also engage in nearby skiing (both alpine and cross-country), biking or hiking to the waterfalls, streams and lakes in the area, including nearby Falls of the McCloud River, Burney Falls, Mossbrae Falls, Lake Siskiyou, Castle Lake and Shasta Lake, or visiting the ruins of one of the great nightclubs or speakeasies from the heyday of the Roaring Twenties.

Geography

Demographics

2010
At the 2010 census McCloud had a population of 1,101. The racial makeup of McCloud was 1,039 (94.4%) White, 8 (0.7%) African American, 10 (0.9%) Native American, 6 (0.5%) Asian, 0 (0.0%) Pacific Islander, 5 (0.5%) from other races, and 33 (3.0%) from two or more races. Hispanic or Latino of any race were 65 people (5.9%).

The census reported that 1,099 people (99.8% of the population) lived in households, 2 (0.2%) lived in non-institutionalized group quarters, and no one was institutionalized.

There were 528 households, 109 (20.6%) had children under the age of 18 living in them, 240 (45.5%) were opposite-sex married couples living together, 48 (9.1%) had a female householder with no husband present, 22 (4.2%) had a male householder with no wife present.  There were 29 (5.5%) unmarried opposite-sex partnerships, and 3 (0.6%) same-sex married couples or partnerships. 190 households (36.0%) were one person and 96 (18.2%) had someone living alone who was 65 or older. The average household size was 2.08.  There were 310 families (58.7% of households); the average family size was 2.66.

The age distribution was 188 people (17.1%) under the age of 18, 67 people (6.1%) aged 18 to 24, 186 people (16.9%) aged 25 to 44, 369 people (33.5%) aged 45 to 64, and 291 people (26.4%) who were 65 or older.  The median age was 51.8 years. For every 100 females, there were 94.2 males.  For every 100 females age 18 and over, there were 93.0 males.

There were 732 housing units at an average density of 294.2 per square mile, of the occupied units 330 (62.5%) were owner-occupied and 198 (37.5%) were rented. The homeowner vacancy rate was 2.9%; the rental vacancy rate was 11.2%.  676 people (61.4% of the population) lived in owner-occupied housing units and 423 people (38.4%) lived in rental housing units.

2000

At the 2000 census there were 1,343 people, 581 households, and 393 families in the CDP. The racial makeup of the CDP was 90.02% White, 1.94% African American, 1.86% Native American, 1.19% Asian, 0.45% Pacific Islander, 1.04% from other races, and 3.50% from two or more races. Hispanic or Latino of any race were 5.73%.

Of the 581 households 27.0% had children under the age of 18 living with them, 49.7% were married couples living together, 11.0% had a female householder with no husband present, and 32.2% were non-families. 28.6% of households were one person and 15.5% were one person aged 65 or older.  The average household size was 2.31 and the average family size was 2.81.

The age distribution was 24.3% under the age of 18, 5.9% from 18 to 24, 21.3% from 25 to 44, 27.3% from 45 to 64, and 21.1% 65 or older.  The median age was 44 years. For every 100 females, there were 90.0 males.  For every 100 females age 18 and over, there were 90.3 males.

The median household income was $29,500 and the median family income  was $35,882. Males had a median income of $34,792 versus $19,545 for females. The per capita income for the CDP was $15,974.  About 14.5% of families and 18.1% of the population were below the poverty line, including 30.3% of those under age 18 and 5.9% of those age 65 or over.

Climate
This region experiences warm (but not hot) and dry summers, with no average monthly temperatures above .  According to the Köppen Climate Classification system, McCloud has a warm-summer Mediterranean climate, abbreviated "Csb" on climate maps.

Politics

Nestle plant
In 2006 Nestlé began a negotiations process with the town of McCloud to build one of the nation's largest bottled water plants and use a portion of the water flowing from the springs of Mt. Shasta. The contract process was protested by local special interest groups whose claims include that Nestle neglected to study the impact on the region's ground water and have overstated the potential economic benefits of the proposed plant. Nestle also agreed to monitor the impact of the plant on the local watershed for two years. Nestle opened a different bottling plant in Sacramento, in July 2009, and then in September 2009 Nestle announced they would no longer pursue any bottling operation in McCloud. Nestle plans to sell the property they had acquired for the bottling site, which was the site of the defunct McCloud lumber mill (closed by last mill owners CalCedar).

Notable people
 Pat Clements, baseball player.
 Jerre Noe, computer scientist.

See also

 List of census-designated places in California
 Ross McCloud, origin of place name

References

External links

 McCloud Chamber of Commerce website
 McCloud Information website 

Mount Shasta
Census-designated places in Siskiyou County, California
Census-designated places in California